is a seinen manga series written and illustrated by Ritz Kobayashi. The series follows the title character Saki Miyanaga who plays competitive Japanese Mahjong, also called Rīchi Mahjong, for her high school club.

Saki is published in the twice monthly Square Enix manga magazine Young Gangan and began serialization in its June 16, 2006, issue. Kobayashi previously placed the series on hiatus for several weeks in 2009 and 2011. The series is published in Taiwan by Tong Li Publishing under the title Tiāncái Májiàng Shàonǚ (literally "Genius Mahjong Girl"). Yen Press publishes an english digital version. The series has two spin-off manga series. Saki Biyori is a 4-panel manga series written by Saya Kiyoshi, which began serialization in Young Gangan from June 17, 2011. Saki Achiga-hen episode of Side-A is a side-story written by Kobayashi and illustrated by Aguri Igarashi, which began serialisation in Monthly Shōnen Gangan from August 12, 2011. The story follows Nodoka Haramura's former classmate, Shizuno Takakamo, who revives her school's mahjong club with the dream of facing Nodoka in the inter-high national championships. Saki was adapted into an anime television series by Gonzo which aired in 2009 while an anime adaptation of Saki Achiga-hen by Studio Gokumi began airing in 2012.


Volume list

Saki

Saki Achiga-hen episode of Side-A

Saki Biyori

Side Story of Saki: Shinohayu the Dawn of Age

Toki

See also
List of Saki episodes

References

External links
Saki official website 

Saki